Hella Wuolijoki (née Ella Marie Murrik; 22 July 1886 – 2 February 1954), also known by the pen name Juhani Tervapää, was an Estonian-born Finnish writer known for her Niskavuori series.

Early life
Wuolijoki was born in the hamlet of Ala in Helme Parish (now in Tõrva Parish), Valga County, Governorate of Livonia. She began her studies in Tartu, before moving to Helsinki in 1904. In 1908, she married Sulo Vuolijoki, a personal friend of Lenin. They divorced in 1923. Later, Wuolijoki began spelling her name with a W.

Career

Author
Wuolijoki wrote several books under the male pseudonym Juhani Tervapää that were characterised by strong female characters. The 1947 film The Farmer's Daughter was adapted from her 1937 play Juurakon Hulda, which she also wrote as Juhani Tervapää. She collaborated with Bertolt Brecht on the initial version of his Mr Puntila and his Man Matti.

Spy
In the 1920s and 1930s, Wuolijoki hosted a literary and political salon that discussed culture and promoted left-wing ideas. She had secret connections with the Soviet intelligence and security structures. The Finnish police suspected her of being an illegal resident spy, but there was no solid proof until 1943, when she was arrested for hiding Kerttu Nuorteva, a Soviet paratrooper spy on a mission to acquire information about the political sentiment and the German troops in Finland, and sentenced to life imprisonment. She was released in 1944, after the armistice that ended the Continuation War.

Post-war and death
Wuolijoki was a member of the Finnish Parliament and the head of the SKDL parliamentary group from 1946 to 1947. Wuolijoki also served as the director of the national broadcasting company, YLE, from 1945 to 1949.

Wuolijoki died in Helsinki in 1954, aged 67.

Personal life
Her younger sister, Salme Dutt, was an influential member of the Communist Party of Great Britain. Wuolijoki was the grandmother of Erkki Tuomioja (b.1946), Finland's minister for foreign affairs between 2011 and 2015.

Works 
 Juurakon Hulda (1937)
 Entäs nyt, Niskavuori? (1953)

References

External links

 Hella Wuolijoki in 375 humanists 9.1.2015, Faculty of Arts, University of Helsinki

1886 births
1954 deaths
People from Tõrva Parish
People from Kreis Fellin
Estonian emigrants to Finland
Finnish people of Estonian descent
Finnish People's Democratic League politicians
Members of the Parliament of Finland (1945–48)
Finnish people of World War II
Estonian women novelists
Finnish women novelists
Pseudonymous women writers
Prisoners sentenced to life imprisonment by Finland
Finnish prisoners sentenced to life imprisonment
20th-century Finnish novelists
20th-century Finnish women writers
20th-century Finnish women politicians
Women members of the Parliament of Finland
20th-century Estonian novelists
Women in World War II
20th-century pseudonymous writers
Finnish salon-holders